The Nova Aeron is an Austrian single-place paraglider that was designed by Hannes Papesch and produced by Nova Performance Paragliders of Innsbruck. It is now out of production.

Design and development
The aircraft was designed as an advanced performance glider. The models are each named for their relative size.

Variants
Aeron XS
Extra small-sized model for lighter pilots. The glider model is DHV 2 and AFNOR Performance certified.
Aeron S
Small-sized model for light pilots. The glider model is DHV 2 and AFNOR Performance certified.
Aeron M
Mid-sized model for medium-weight pilots. The glider model is DHV 2 and AFNOR Performance certified.
Aeron L
Large-sized model for heavier pilots. The glider model is DHV 2 and AFNOR Performance certified.

Specifications (Aeron M)

References

Aeron
Paragliders